Kovanci is a village located in the Gevgelija Municipality of North Macedonia. Its coordinates are 41° 13' 25" North, 22° 25' 14" East.

Demographics
According to the 2002 census, the village had a total of 177 inhabitants. Ethnic groups in the village include:

Macedonians 176
Serbs 1

References

Villages in Gevgelija Municipality